The Tramways of the Salinas Chicas were two  gauge railways with a total length of . They ran from the Nicolás Levalle railway station(es) to the Salinas Chicas in the La Pampa Province between Neuquén und Bahía Blanca in Argentina.

History 
The salt was initially pushed together with graders pulled by mules and transported to the railway station in tippers.

In the beginning, animals were used to mine about 500 to 1000 tons of salt per year, and from 1910 steam locomotives manufactured by Orenstein & Koppel and Krauss (N° 5998/1908) were also used, with wagons made in Germany. At this time, another company was founded nearby under the name of Salina Las Barrancas. From the 1950s, tractors were used to mine 50,000 to 200,000 tonnes of salt per year.

The operation of the tramway ceased in 1990. Today, La Aurora SAIC y G. extracts about 1000 tons of salt per day on an industrial scale, washes it, packages it mainly in 50 kg bags and sells it.

External links 
 www.salaurora.com.ar (official Website of La Aurora SAIC y G.)
  The 750mm gauge Krauss 0-6-0T (5998/1908) at “Salitrera La Aurora”, near Bahía Blanca

References 

Railway lines in Argentina
Railway lines closed in 1990
750 mm gauge railways